Diz Iz It! is a 2010 Philippine television variety show broadcast by GMA Network. Originally named as Todo Bigay, it premiered on February 8, 2010 replacing Kapuso Movie Festival. The show concluded on July 24, 2010 with a total of 127 episodes. It was replaced by Kapuso Movie Festival in its timeslot.

Hosts
 Bayani Agbayani
 Grace Lee
 Sam Y.G. a.k.a. Shivaker
 Ehra Madrigal

Format
Hosted by Bayani Agbayani, Ehra Madrigal, Grace Lee and Sam Y.G. (a.k.a. Shivaker), Diz Iz It! comprises five contestants who compete for 50,000 PHP daily cash prize by displaying their entertaining production numbers. The contestants are subjected into a dance competition. Aside from the major prize in the Best in Talent segment, an additional 30,000 PHP in the game show proper awaits the participating contestant.

Segments
 Diz Iz Ur Moment: Studio audience get a chance to showcase their talent in 30 seconds.
 Mic Mo 'To!: Studio audience members get a chance to greet their loved ones.
 Diz Iz Aktingan: Contestants act scenes with a celebrity judge and/or Shivaker.
 Diz Iz Kantahan: Challenge the Champion: Contestants sing to win the vied prize.
 Diz Iz Zayawan Remix: Dancing contestants dance to remixed songs with the songs' original elements as well as the group's signature moves.
 Lam Ko, Lam Mo: A studio audience member is chosen and has to pick someone they have never met. If they, the new "friend" as the Diz Iz It! hosts phrase it, get it right they both win over PhP 1,000!

Criteria of judging was both 50% for performance level and entertainment value.

Judges
 Michelle Obomshell has been a mainstay judge ever since he first appeared on this show. He was requested by popular demand because of his comedic styles.
 Sita & Tera were the original judges that appeared for a month. Because they always criticize and look on the bad side, due to audience reaction and avoidance of prevention by MTRCB, these judges were removed as of the later part of March 2010.

Ratings
According to AGB Nielsen Philippines' Mega Manila household television ratings, the pilot episode of Diz Iz It! earned a 13.6% rating.

References

External links
 

2010 Philippine television series debuts
2010 Philippine television series endings
Filipino-language television shows
GMA Network original programming
Philippine variety television shows
Television series by TAPE Inc.